Utricularia moniliformis is a small perennial carnivorous plant that belongs to the genus Utricularia. It is endemic to Sri Lanka. It was formally described as a species by Peter Taylor in 1986, although it was first recorded as U. orbiculata by George Henry Kendrick Thwaites in 1860 and later by Karl Immanuel Eberhard Goebel in 1890.

See also 
 List of Utricularia species

References 

Carnivorous plants of Asia
Flora of Sri Lanka
Plants described in 1986
moniliformis